Jean-Albert Cartier (15 May 1930 – 27 December 2015) was a French art critic and director of cultural institutions. He was director of the Paris Opera from 1989 to 1991.

Life 
Born in Marseille, passionate about the visual arts, Cartier studied at the École du Louvre. He was an art critic for 15 years at Combat.

Cartier was also director of the Théâtre musical de Paris (1980-1988), administrator of the Paris Opera (1989-1991), delegate for music programmes at the music directorate at Radio France (1991-1993), general director of the Opéra de Nice (1994-1997), founder of the Europa Danse Project of Grasse in 1999 and president of the International Dance Institute with the Unesco.

In 1987, he was nominated "".

Works 
 Le Manteau d'Arlequin, prefaces by Gérard Fromanger, Jiří Kylián and Jorge Lavelli. Paris, éditions de l’Amandier, 304 p. .

References

External links 

1930 births
2015 deaths
Writers from Marseille
French art critics
20th-century French journalists
French theatre managers and producers
Directors of the Paris Opera